Marc David Kestecher (born March 22, 1968) is a play-by-play announcer radio sports and news anchor.

Early life and education
He was raised in Guilderland, New York and graduated from Syracuse University's S. I. Newhouse School of Public Communications.

Career
Kestecher began his career with play-by-play work for the Albany Patroons. He later took studio positions at WKNR in Cleveland and WPTR (AM) and WROW in Albany, New York where he provided score updates and hosted talk programming. Kestecher joined ESPN Radio in 1999, first hosting ESPN Radio SportsCenter and studio coverage of major sporting events.

He was named as the lead play-by-play announcer for the NBA on ESPN Radio in 2016, replacing Kevin Calabro who opted to return to the Pacific Northwest to call play-by-play for the Portland Trail Blazers. In this role he calls the NBA playoffs and NBA Finals with Hubie Brown. Kestecher also does play-by-play for college football games and Football Sunday on ESPN Radio. In addition to his radio work, he also does play-by-play for ESPN's coverage of the NCAA Division I women's basketball tournament and select NBA on ESPN games when the main staff has other commitments, and college football games for Group of 5 conference games on ESPNU.

References

1968 births
Living people
American radio personalities
American radio sports announcers
American television sports announcers
Arena football announcers
College basketball announcers in the United States
College football announcers
Major League Baseball broadcasters
Minor League Baseball broadcasters
National Basketball Association broadcasters
National Football League announcers
People from Guilderland, New York
S.I. Newhouse School of Public Communications alumni
Women's college basketball announcers in the United States